Pongola may refer to:
Pongola, KwaZulu-Natal, a town in South Africa
Pongola River, a river in South Africa
Pongola glaciation, a glaciation period 2900 million years ago